All Men Are Liars is a 1919 British silent drama film directed by Sidney Morgan and starring Alice Russon, Bruce Gordon and Jessie Earle.

Cast
 Alice Russon as Hope  
 Bruce Gordon as Stephen  
 Jessie Earle as Isobel 
 George Harrington as Luke

References

Bibliography
 Low, Rachael. The History of the British Film 1918-1929. George Allen & Unwin, 1971.

External links
 

1919 films
British drama films
British silent feature films
1910s English-language films
Films directed by Sidney Morgan
1919 drama films
Films set in England
Films based on British novels
British black-and-white films
1910s British films
Silent drama films